This article refers to the now-demolished Peter G. Van Winkle House. For the Van Winkle-Wix House, see Julia-Ann Square Historic District.

The Peter G. Van Winkle House was a historic home located in the Julia-Ann Square Historic District in Parkersburg, Wood County, West Virginia.  It was built between about 1880 and 1899, and was a two-story duplex in the Queen Anne style.  It featured a deck hipped roof with intersecting gables, turrets, and dormers.  It was built on property once owned by former United States Senator Peter G. Van Winkle, who died in 1872.

It was listed on the National Register of Historic Places in 1982. It was demolished in 1994. The nearby Van Winkle-Wix House remains extant.

References

Houses on the National Register of Historic Places in West Virginia
Houses in Parkersburg, West Virginia
Queen Anne architecture in West Virginia
Houses completed in 1899
Demolished buildings and structures in West Virginia
National Register of Historic Places in Wood County, West Virginia
1880 establishments in West Virginia